The 1922–23 Austrian First Class season was the twelfth season of top-tier football in Austria. SK Rapid Wien claim their eighth Austrian title after winning the title by four points over second place SV Amateure. On the other end of the table, Floridsdorfer AC, Wiener AC and SC Rudolfshügel were all relegated to the second tier of Austrian football.

League standings

Results

References
Austria - List of final tables (RSSSF)

Austrian Football Bundesliga seasons
Austria
1922–23 in Austrian football